The Worst Person in the World is a 2021 Norwegian romantic black comedy-drama film directed by Joachim Trier. It is the third film in the director's "Oslo Trilogy", following Reprise (2006) and Oslo, August 31st (2011). The film premiered in competition at the 2021 Cannes Film Festival to widespread critical acclaim, with Renate Reinsve winning the award for Best Actress for her performance in the film. At the 94th Academy Awards, the film was nominated for Best International Feature Film and Best Original Screenplay. The score for the film was written by Ola Fløttum.

Plot
Julie is a medical student in Oslo who transfers to psychology and then photography. In her late 20s, she starts a relationship with Aksel Willman, a comic artist 15 years older than her. Now dabbling in writing, she spends a weekend with Aksel at his parents' house. Aksel floats the idea of starting a family with Julie, but Julie is uncertain. While walking home from a publishing event for Aksel, Julie crashes a wedding reception and meets Eivind, a barista. Though both are in relationships, they spend the night together sharing jokes and intimacies, but without sexual relations. They exchange only their first names and part ways.

Julie writes a short story about feminism and oral sex. Aksel is impressed with it and encourages her to post it online, where it receives attention. She celebrates her 30th birthday at her divorced mother's home but her estranged father fails to attend, claiming back pain. Days later, Julie's half-sister inadvertently reveals that their father was watching her play at a football tournament on the day of her birthday. He makes excuses to decline Aksel's invitation to visit him and Julie in Oslo. While working at a bookstore, Julie encounters Eivind and his girlfriend Sunniva. At dinner with Aksel's brother and sister-in-law, Aksel complains about the sanitised cinematic adaptation of his politically incorrect comic series Bobcat, leaving Julie feeling bored and ignored. She dreams that she goes on a date with Eivind, where they fall in love. The next day, she breaks up with Aksel.

Eivind leaves an obsessively social-justice-and-climate-conscious Sunniva because of her restrictive lifestyle. Julie and Eivind move in together. He hosts a small party where one of his friends uncovers Eivind's stash of psychedelic mushrooms, which Julie consumes, leading to hallucinations. The following night, she confides in Eivind that she can be herself around him, but he seems to ignore her claims. Aksel's brother happens upon Julie at work and discloses that Aksel has inoperable pancreatic cancer. Sometime later, Eivind finds the short story Julie had written. When he assumes it is based on her real-life experiences, Julie angrily denies it and patronises him.

Julie learns she is pregnant and delays telling Eivind. She visits Aksel in the hospital where Aksel confides that he is afraid to die and still loves her. Julie admits that she is pregnant. Despite his assertions that she would be a good mother, she remains frightened. Returning home, Julie tells Eivind about her pregnancy, and they decide to separate while she determines whether she wants to keep the child. After spending time with Aksel, Julie later receives a voicemail from his brother reporting that Aksel is unlikely to survive the night. While showering, she has a miscarriage.

Sometime later, Julie is working as an on-set photographer for a film shoot. She photographs an actress and then sees her outside with Eivind and a baby. She returns home to edit the day's photos.

Cast

Release
MK2 Films secured a sales deal on the film in February 2021. The film had its world premiere in competition for the Palme d'Or at the 2021 Cannes Film Festival on 7 July. A week later, the film's US distribution rights were sold to Neon, while UK and Ireland rights were acquired by Mubi.

The Worst Person in the World had its North American premiere on 11 September as a Gala Presentation at the 2021 Toronto International Film Festival. The film was released theatrically in France on 13 October 2021 by Memento Distribution, in Norway on 15 October 2021 by SF Studios and in Sweden on 19 November 2021 by TriArt Film.

The Worst Person in the World became a part of the Criterion Collection with Blu-ray, and DVD releases on 28 June 2022.

Reception
 

The Guardian's Peter Bradshaw described the film as "one of Cannes' best" and "an instant classic". Richard Lawson of Vanity Fair called it "exquisite, wistful (and downright sad)", praising the cast performances and Trier's writing. In his review for IndieWire, David Ehrlich gave the film a grade of B and commended Reinsve's performance, stating "If Julie is less of a character than a vividly realized archetype, Reinsve didn’t get the message." Vanity Fair and The Atlantic declared The Worst Person in the World to be the best film of 2021.

Accolades

See also
 List of submissions to the 94th Academy Awards for Best International Feature Film
 List of Norwegian submissions for the Academy Award for Best International Feature Film

References

External links
 
 
 

2021 films
2021 independent films
2021 romantic comedy-drama films
2020s French films
2020s Norwegian-language films
2020s Swedish films
Danish romantic comedy-drama films
Films directed by Joachim Trier
Films set in Oslo
Films shot in Oslo
Films with screenplays by Eskil Vogt
French romantic comedy-drama films
Norwegian romantic comedy-drama films
Swedish romantic comedy-drama films